Anas el-Wugood is an opera in Arabic by the Egyptian composer Aziz El-Shawan. It was written in 1970 but not premiered until 1995.
The plot is based on a character from the Arabian Nights, Uns el Wujud "Delight of the World," who was beloved by the fair Zahar el-Waard "Flower of the Rose".

References

Arabic-language operas
1995 operas
1970 operas